Dashjamtsyn Mönkhbat (born 27 December 1961) is a Mongolian former cyclist. He competed in two events at the 1992 Summer Olympics.

References

External links
 

1961 births
Living people
Mongolian male cyclists
Olympic cyclists of Mongolia
Cyclists at the 1992 Summer Olympics
Place of birth missing (living people)
Cyclists at the 1990 Asian Games
Asian Games medalists in cycling
Asian Games silver medalists for Mongolia
Medalists at the 1990 Asian Games